Dave Brubeck (1920–2012) was an American jazz pianist and composer.

As leader

Compilations
Dave Brubeck's Greatest Hits (Columbia CS 9284 / CL 2484, 1966)
Interchanges '54 (Columbia Jazz Masterpieces 467917 2, 1991)
Ballads (Legacy 501795 2, 2001)
The Essential Dave Brubeck (Columbia Legacy, 2003)

Guest appearances
With Yo-Yo Ma
 "Joy to the World" and "Concordia" on Songs of Joy and Peace by Yo-Yo Ma & Friends (Sony Classical, 2008)
Various artists
 "Some Day My Prince Will Come" and "Alice in Wonderland" (with Roberta Gambarini) on Everybody Wants to Be a Cat: Disney Jazz Volume 1 (Disney, 2011)

References

Discographies of American artists